Otopheidomenis is a genus of mites in the family Otopheidomenidae. There are at least three described species in Otopheidomenis.

Species
These three species belong to the genus Otopheidomenis:
 Otopheidomenis cocytes
 Otopheidomenis kayosiekeri
 Otopheidomenis zalelestes

References

Mesostigmata
Articles created by Qbugbot